Zhang Jun (born 1 July 1992) is a Chinese-born Hong Kong footballer who is currently a free agent.

Career statistics

Club

Notes

References

1992 births
Living people
Chinese footballers
Chinese expatriate footballers
Association football midfielders
Hong Kong Premier League players
Hong Kong First Division League players
Shanghai Shenxin F.C. players
Sun Hei SC players
Dreams Sports Club players
Mutual FC players
Hong Kong Rangers FC players
Chinese expatriate sportspeople in Hong Kong
Expatriate footballers in Hong Kong